Finansavisen is a Norwegian business newspaper published by Hegnar Media in Oslo, Norway.

History and profile
Finansavisen was first published on 1 October 1992 by Trygve Hegnar, who is also editor-in-chief. The paper has its headquarters in Oslo. It has also an associated online edition located at finansavisen.no. It has a right-wing and neoliberal political stance.

The 1997 circulation of Finansavisen was 11,477 copies. The paper had a circulation of 23,274 copies in 2006. In 2013 the circulation of the paper was 24,742 copies.

References

External links
 Official website

1992 establishments in Norway
Publications established in 1992
Norwegian-language newspapers
Business newspapers
Newspapers published in Oslo